Carlos González Peña (born 28 July 1983) is a Spanish professional football manager and former player who is the current head coach of Indian Super League club Goa.

He amassed Segunda División totals of 322 matches and four goals, in service of six clubs. He added 54 appearances in La Liga (one goal) for Valladolid, and also competed professionally in India.

Playing career
Peña was born in Salamanca, Castile and León. An unsuccessful FC Barcelona youth graduate (he only played with its C and B sides for five years), he went on to establish himself as a professional with Albacete Balompié in the Segunda División, appearing in 106 official matches over three seasons.

For the 2009–10 campaign, Peña stayed in that level as he signed with Recreativo de Huelva for four years. He continued to be first choice at his new club but, after only one season, moved to Real Valladolid, recently relegated from La Liga.

Peña contributed 35 games and one goal in his second year, helping the Pucelanos return to the top flight after two years out. He made his debut in the competition on 27 August 2012, coming on as a late substitute in a 2–0 home win against Levante UD.

Peña scored his first goal in the top tier on 11 May 2014, but also put one in his own net in a 4–3 away loss to Real Betis, and Valladolid ultimately suffered relegation. On 25 June 2015, he signed a two-year deal with Real Oviedo, newly promoted to the second division.

On 23 December 2016, the 33-year-old Peña joined fellow league club Getafe CF until June 2018, after cutting ties with the Asturians. The following 19 July, he moved to Lorca FC also in division two.

On 29 July 2018, Peña moved abroad for the first time in his career and joined Indian Super League franchise FC Goa. In April 2020, he announced his retirement.

Coaching career
Peña worked with CF Lorca Deportiva, UCAM Murcia CF and Albacete's youth teams after retiring. On 16 April 2022, he was appointed manager of his last club Goa.

Career statistics

Club

Managerial statistics

Honours
Goa
ISL League Winners Shield: 2019–20
Super Cup: 2019

Spain U19
UEFA European Under-19 Championship: 2002

Spain U20
FIFA U-20 World Cup runner-up: 2003

References

External links

1983 births
Living people
Sportspeople from Salamanca
Spanish footballers
Footballers from Castile and León
Association football defenders
La Liga players
Segunda División players
Segunda División B players
Tercera División players
CF Damm players
FC Barcelona C players
FC Barcelona Atlètic players
Albacete Balompié players
Recreativo de Huelva players
Real Valladolid players
Real Oviedo players
Getafe CF footballers
Lorca FC players
Indian Super League players
FC Goa players
Spain youth international footballers
Spain under-21 international footballers
Spanish expatriate footballers
Expatriate footballers in India
Spanish expatriate sportspeople in India
Spanish football managers
Indian Super League head coaches
FC Goa managers
Spanish expatriate football managers
Expatriate football managers in India